Walter Fisher may refer to:

Walter Fisher (MP), Member of Parliament for Hythe
Walter Fisher (medical missionary), (1865–1935) medical missionary to Zambia
Walter Fisher (professor) (1931–2018), American professor
Walter H. Fisher (1849–1890), English singer and actor
Walter Kenrick Fisher (1878–1953), American marine biologist, zoologist and illustrator
Walter L. Fisher (1862–1935), United States Secretary of the Interior